Zostera caulescens is a species of eelgrass native to the shores of northeastern Asia: Japan, Korea, northeastern China (Liaoning), and the Russian Far East (Kuril Islands).

References

caulescens
Flora of Liaoning
Flora of China
Flora of Russia
Flora of Japan
Biota of the Pacific Ocean
Flora of Korea
Plants described in 1932
Salt marsh plants